Luo Xin (Chinese: 罗歆; born 7 February 1990 in Chongqing) is a Chinese football player who currently plays for Henan Jianye as a defender in the Chinese Super League.

Club career
Luo Xin was promoted to Chongqing Lifan's first team squad in 2011. On 23 April 2011, he made his senior debut in a 2–0 win against Yanbian FC, coming on as a substitute for Lü Haidong in the 64th minute. On 22 March 2015, he made his Super League debut in the season's third match game against Henan Jianye. On 23 December 2016, Chongqing Lifan officially confirmed that Luo had left the club after a disagreement in negotiations for extending his contract.

On 28 February 2017, Luo transferred to China League One side Beijing Renhe. He would make his debut for the club in a league game on 11 March 2017 against Shanghai Shenxin that ended in a 2-2 draw. With them he would quickly establish himself as a vital member of the squad that won promotion to the top tier at the end of the 2017 China League One campaign. After three seasons with the club he would leave to join another top tier club in Henan Jianye where he would make his debut for them in a league game on 18 October 2020 in a 1-0 victory against Wuhan Zall.

Career statistics 
Statistics accurate as of match played 7 October 2022.

Honours

Club
Chongqing Lifan
China League One: 2014

References

External links
 

1990 births
Living people
Chinese footballers
Footballers from Chongqing
Chongqing Liangjiang Athletic F.C. players
Beijing Renhe F.C. players
Henan Songshan Longmen F.C. players
Chinese Super League players
China League One players
Association football defenders